Robert Huber (born 1937) is a German biochemist.

Robert Huber may also refer to:

 Robert Huber (engineer) (1901–1995), Swiss engineer
 Robert Huber (footballer) (born 1975), Swiss footballer
 Robert Huber (rower) (1906–1942), German Olympic rower
 Robert Huber (sport shooter) (1878–1946), Finnish sport shooter
 Robert J. Huber (1922–2001), American politician and businessman
 Robert T. Huber (1920–1991), American politician